Zhou Yuchen (born 12 January 1995) is a Chinese professional footballer who currently plays as a goalkeeper for Chinese Super League club Guangzhou City.

Club career
In 2005, Zhou Yuchen joined Chinese Super League side Shandong Luneng Taishan's football school, where he converted from a defender into a goalkeeper. He was sent to Portugal for further training by the club in January 2014. He joined Campeonato de Portugal side Sacavenense in the summer of 2014. Zhou returned to Shandong Luneng and was promoted to the first team squad in 2015, acting as the fourth goalkeeper of the team.

Zhou was loaned to Super League newcomer Hebei China Fortune for one season in February 2016. He didn't appear for China Fortune throughout the entirety of his loan spell.

In July 2017, Zhou was loaned to Hong Kong Premier League side R&F. On 24 September 2017, he made his senior debut  in a 2–1 loss against Lee Man in the first round of 2017–18 Senior Shield. He made his league debut on 28 October 2017 in a 2–1 away win against Yuen Long. Zhou was loaned to R&F again in September 2018. On 14 October 2020, Zhou left the club after his club's withdrawal from the HKPL in the new season.

Career statistics 
.

References

External links
 

1995 births
Living people
Chinese footballers
Footballers from Shandong
People from Weifang
Shandong Taishan F.C. players
Hebei F.C. players
R&F (Hong Kong) players
Association football goalkeepers
Chinese Super League players
Hong Kong Premier League players
Chinese expatriate footballers
Expatriate footballers in Portugal
Chinese expatriate sportspeople in Portugal
Expatriate footballers in Hong Kong
Footballers at the 2018 Asian Games
Asian Games competitors for China